Campeche is a Mexican state.

Campeche  may also refer to:

Place names
 Campeche Municipality
 Campeche, Campeche
 Campeche (Florianópolis)
 Campeche Bank
 Bay of Campeche a.k.a. the "Campeche Sound"
 Roman Catholic Diocese of Campeche
 Historical settlement on Galveston Island, USA, established by the pirate Jean Lafitte
 Campeche (Mexico City Metrobús), a BRT station in Mexico City

Other
 Campeche catshark
 Campeche Spiny-tailed Iguana
 Campeche Pirates
 José Campeche